Carl Edvard Cohen Brandes (21 October 1847, in Copenhagen – 20 December 1931, in Copenhagen) was a Danish politician, critic and author, and the younger brother of Georg Brandes and Ernst Brandes. He had a Ph.D. in eastern philology.

Biography
Brandes was a member of the Folketing for the party Venstre from 1880 to 1894. Along with Viggo Hørup and Christen Berg, Brandes was editor of the newspaper "Morgenbladet" (literally "the morning paper"), which was associated with the party, from 1880 to 1883, when Berg fired Brandes and Hørup over a conflict on the points of view that the newspaper voiced. In 1884, he cofounded the newspaper Politiken with Hørup and Hermann Bang. Brandes used his position within the newspaper to promote literature that supported his own political point of view and to criticize literature which contained nationalliberal or Grundtvigian points of view, often in direct conflict with his opinion of their quality, but nevertheless he played a significant part in reforming literary criticism in Denmark.

He joined the party Det Radikale Venstre shortly after its founding in 1905, and he was a member of the Landsting for the party from the 1906 election until 1927. He was Minister of Finance from 1909 to 1910 and again from 1913 to 1920 as a member of the Cabinets of Zahle I and II.

He was the father-in-law of Norwegian chemist Georg Dedichen, and brother-in-law of Mette-Sophie Gad the wife of French artist Paul Gauguin

References

External links

1847 births
1931 deaths
Politicians from Copenhagen
Jewish Danish politicians
Jewish Danish writers
Venstre (Denmark) politicians
Danish Social Liberal Party politicians
19th-century Danish newspaper editors
19th-century Danish newspaper publishers (people)
Politiken founders
Politiken editors
Danish Finance Ministers
Members of the Landsting (Denmark)
Danish literary critics
Danish newspaper founders
Members of the Folketing 1879–1881 (May)
Members of the Folketing 1881 (May)–1881 (Jul)
Members of the Folketing 1881 (Jul)–1884
Members of the Folketing 1884–1887
Members of the Folketing 1887–1890
Members of the Folketing 1890–1892
Members of the Folketing 1892–1895
Danish magazine founders